Sylvain Chomlafel (born March 15, 1966 in Cezanne, France) is a former professional footballer. He played as a forward.

External links
Sylvain Chomlafel profile at chamoisfc79.fr

1966 births
Living people
French footballers
Association football forwards
CS Sedan Ardennes players
RC Lens players
Chamois Niortais F.C. players
Angers SCO players
SAS Épinal players
Ligue 1 players
Ligue 2 players